Clutton is a civil parish in Cheshire West and Chester, England.  It contains five buildings that are recorded in the National Heritage List for England as designated listed buildings.   Of these, three are listed at Grade II*, and two at Grade II.  Other than the village of Clutton, the parish is entirely rural. The three Grade II* listed buildings are associated with the entrance to the former Carden Hall (which was in the adjoining Carden parish), and the remaining two Grade II listed buildings are domestic.

Key

Buildings

See also
Listed buildings in Carden
Listed buildings in Aldersey
Listed buildings in Chowley
Listed buildings in Broxton
Listed buildings in Barton
Listed buildings in Coddington

References
Citations

Sources

Listed buildings in Cheshire West and Chester
Lists of listed buildings in Cheshire